Achnahannet is the name of several hamlets in Scotland:

 Achnahannet, Strathspey
Achnahannet, Loch Ness
 Achnahannet, Ross and Cromarty